1865 Cerberus is a stony asteroid and near-Earth object of the Apollo group, approximately 1.6 kilometers in diameter. It was discovered on 26 October 1971, by Czech astronomer Luboš Kohoutek at the Hamburger Bergedorf Observatory, Germany, and given the provisional designation . It was named for Cerberus from Greek mythology.

Orbit and classification 

Cerberus orbits the Sun at a distance of 0.6–1.6 AU once every 1 years and 1 month (410 days). Its orbit has an eccentricity of 0.47 and an inclination of 16° with respect to the ecliptic.

It passes within 30 gigametres (Gm) of the Earth 7 times from the year 1900 to the year 2100, each time at a distance of 24.4 Gm to 25.7 Gm. It also makes close approaches to Mars and Venus.

Physical characteristics 

In the Tholen and SMASS taxonomy, Cerberus is a common stony S-type asteroid, composed of 65% plagioclase and 35% pyroxene. It has a rotation period of 6.804 hours and a geometric albedo of 0.220. With a maximum lightcurve range of 2.3, Cerberus may be cigar shaped like 1I/Oumuamua.

Naming 

This minor planet is named after the figure from Greek mythology, Cerberus, a three-headed dog that guarded the entrance to Hades, the Underworld. His capture marked the last of the twelve labors of Hercules. It is also the name of an extinct constellation, Cerberus, now contained in the eastern part of Hercules. (It should not be confused with Kerberos, a moon of the dwarf planet Pluto.) The official  was published by the Minor Planet Center on 20 December 1974.

References

External links 
 Les NEO (Near-Earth Objects), Michel-Alain Combes, (in French)
  Astrosurf, names of NEAs Les Noms des NEA – liste alphabétique (Excel spreadsheet in French)
 Asteroid Lightcurve Database (LCDB), query form (info )
 Dictionary of Minor Planet Names, Google books
 
 
 

001865
Discoveries by Luboš Kohoutek
Named minor planets
001865
001865
19711026